Crelle's Journal, or just Crelle, is the common name for a mathematics journal, the Journal für die reine und angewandte Mathematik (in English: Journal for Pure and Applied Mathematics).

History 
The journal was founded by August Leopold Crelle (Berlin) in 1826 and edited by him until his death in 1855. It was one of the first major mathematical journals that was not a proceedings of an academy. It has published many notable papers, including works of Niels Henrik Abel, Georg Cantor, Gotthold Eisenstein, Carl Friedrich Gauss and Otto Hesse. It was edited by Carl Wilhelm Borchardt from 1856 to 1880, during which time it was known as Borchardt's Journal. The current editor-in-chief is Daniel Huybrechts (Rheinische Friedrich-Wilhelms-Universität Bonn).

Past editors 
 
 1826–1856 August Leopold Crelle
 1856–1880 Carl Wilhelm Borchardt
 1881–1888 Leopold Kronecker, Karl Weierstrass
 1889–1892 Leopold Kronecker
 1892–1902 Lazarus Fuchs
 1903–1928 Kurt Hensel
 1929–1933 Kurt Hensel, Helmut Hasse, Ludwig Schlesinger
 1934–1936 Kurt Hensel, Helmut Hasse
 1937–1952 Helmut Hasse
 1952–1977 Helmut Hasse, Hans Rohrbach
 1977–1980 Helmut Hasse

References

External links 
 
 Journal archive at the Göttinger Digitalisierungszentrum
 Journal index at The European Digital Mathematics Library

Multilingual journals
English-language journals
French-language journals
German-language journals
Mathematics journals
Publications established in 1826
Monthly journals
De Gruyter academic journals
1826 establishments in Prussia